In mathematics, an almost perfect number (sometimes also called slightly defective or least deficient number) is a natural number n such that the sum of all divisors of n (the sum-of-divisors function σ(n)) is equal to 2n − 1, the sum of all proper divisors of n, s(n) = σ(n) − n, then being equal to n − 1. The only known almost perfect numbers are powers of 2 with non-negative exponents . Therefore the only known odd almost perfect number is 20 = 1, and the only known even almost perfect numbers are those of the form 2k for some positive integer k; however, it has not been shown that all almost perfect numbers are of this form.  It is known that an odd almost perfect number greater than 1 would have at least six prime factors.

If m is an odd almost perfect number then  is a Descartes number.

See also 
Perfect number
Quasiperfect number

References

Further reading

External links 
 

Arithmetic dynamics
Divisor function
Integer sequences